This page covers all relevant details regarding PFC Cherno More Varna for all official competitions inside the 2014–15 season. These are A PFG and Bulgarian Cup.

Transfers

In

Out

Loans in

Squad information

Competitions

Overall

Competition Record

Start formations

Accounts for all competitions. Numbers constitute according game of the competition in which the formation was used, NOT number of occurrences.

Most used starting XI.

Minutes On The Pitch
Includes injury time.  Positions indicate the most natural position of the particular player, followed by alternative position(s) where he actually started at least one game during the course of the season.

Débuts
Players making their first team Cherno More début in a competitive match.

Goalscorers

Assists

Goalscorers' Effectiveness

Goals Per Game

Minutes Per Goal

Own Goals

Penalties

Captains

Clean sheets

Suspensions served

Injuries

Players in bold are still out from their injuries.  Players listed will/have miss(ed) at least one competitive game (missing from whole match day squad).

Home attendances
Correct as of match played on 26 May 2015.

{| class="wikitable sortable" style="text-align:center; font-size:90%"
|-
!width=100 | Comp
!width=120 class="unsortable" | Date
!width=60 | Score
!width=250 class="unsortable" | Opponent
!width=150 | Attendance
|-
|A PFG||26 July 2014 ||bgcolor="#FFFFCC"|0–0 ||Ludogorets ||3,790
|-
|A PFG||9 August 2014 ||bgcolor="#FFCCCC"|0–1 ||Marek ||800
|-
|A PFG||23 August 2014 ||bgcolor="#CCFFCC"|3–0 ||Lokomotiv Plovdiv ||750
|-
|A PFG||13 September 2014 ||bgcolor="#FFFFCC"|1–1 ||CSKA ||4,500
|-
|A PFG||28 September 2014 ||bgcolor="#FFCCCC"|0–1 ||Lokomotiv Sofia ||1,460
|-
|A PFG||19 October 2014 ||bgcolor="#CCFFCC"|4–0 ||Beroe ||1,440
|-
|Bulgarian Cup||28 October 2014 ||bgcolor="#CCFFCC"|2–0 ||Slavia ||380
|-
|A PFG||2 November 2014 ||bgcolor="#CCFFCC"|2–1 ||Botev Plovdiv ||2,430
|-
|A PFG||22 November 2014 ||bgcolor="#FFCCCC"|0–3 ||Litex ||1,190
|-
|A PFG||6 December 2014 ||bgcolor="#CCFFCC"|1–0 ||Levski ||2,600
|-
|Bulgarian Cup||21 February 2015 ||bgcolor="#CCFFCC"|1–0 ||Lokomotiv Gorna Oryahovitsa ||1,340
|-
|A PFG||27 February 2015 ||bgcolor="#CCFFCC"|2–0 ||Slavia ||970
|-
|A PFG||13 March 2015 ||bgcolor="#CCFFCC"|1–0 ||Haskovo ||440
|-
|A PFG||20 March 2015 ||bgcolor="#CCFFCC"|2–0 ||Marek ||380
|-
|Bulgarian Cup||7 April 2015 ||bgcolor="#CCFFCC"|5–1 ||Lokomotiv Plovdiv ||1,600
|-
|A PFG||10 April 2015 ||bgcolor="#CCFFCC"|2–0 ||Haskovo ||430
|-
|A PFG||19 April 2015 ||bgcolor="#FFFFCC"|1–1 ||Slavia ||1,280
|-
|A PFG||9 May 2015 ||bgcolor="#FFCCCC"|0–2 ||Levski ||4,710
|-
|A PFG||26 May 2015 ||bgcolor="#FFCCCC"|1–2 ||Lokomotiv Plovdiv ||220
|-
|bgcolor="#C0C0C0"|
|bgcolor="#C0C0C0"|
|bgcolor="#C0C0C0"|
| Total attendance
|30,710
|-
|bgcolor="#C0C0C0"|
|bgcolor="#C0C0C0"|
|bgcolor="#C0C0C0"|
| Total league attendance
|27,390
|-
|bgcolor="#C0C0C0"|
|bgcolor="#C0C0C0"|
|bgcolor="#C0C0C0"|
| Average attendance
|1,616
|-
|bgcolor="#C0C0C0"|
|bgcolor="#C0C0C0"|
|bgcolor="#C0C0C0"|
| Average league attendance
|1,712

Club

Coaching staff
{|class="wikitable"
!Position
!Staff
|-
|-
|Manager|| Aleksandar Stankov (until 18 August), then  Nikola Spasov
|-
|Assistant First Team Coach|| Zhikitsa Tasevski (until 18 August)
|-
|Assistant First Team Coach|| Emanuil Lukanov
|-
|Goalkeeper Coach|| Stoyan Stavrev
|-
|First Team Fitness Coach|| Veselin Markov
|-
|Individual Team Fitness Coach|| Viktor Bumbalov
|-
|Medical Director|| Dr. Petko Atev
|-
|Academy Manager|| Hristina Dimitrova
|-

Other information

References

PFC Cherno More Varna seasons
Cherno More Varna